The 2013 Japan Super Series was the eighth super series tournament of the 2013 BWF Super Series. The tournament was held in Tokyo, Japan from 17–22 September 2013 and had a total purse of $200,000.

Men's singles

Seeds

Top half

Bottom half

Finals

Women's singles

Seeds

Top half

Bottom half

Finals

Men's doubles

Seeds

Top half

Bottom half

Finals

Women's doubles

Seeds

Top half

Bottom half

Finals

Mixed doubles

Seeds

Top half

Bottom half

Finals

References 

Japan
Japan Open (badminton)
2013 in Japanese sport
Sports competitions in Tokyo